Simon Lüchinger (born 28 November 2002) is a Liechtenstein footballer who plays as a midfielder for FC Vaduz and the Liechtenstein national team.

Club career
Lüchinger signed his first professional contract with Vaduz on 16 December 2021.

On 11 June 2022, Lüchinger was loaned to Eschen/Mauren. The loan was terminated early on 6 September 2022.

International career
Lüchinger has served as the captain of Liechtenstein's under-21 national team. He was first named the captain of the team at the age of 17 by then-head coach Martin Stocklasa, becoming the youngest player to captain the under-21 team in Liechtenstein's history. He made his under-21 debut on 6 June 2019 in a 1–0 win over Azerbaijan.

Lüchinger made his international senior debut for Liechtenstein on 7 June 2021 in a friendly match against Faroe Islands.

Career statistics

International

References

External links
Saint Francis University profile
National Football Teams profile

2002 births
Living people
Liechtenstein footballers
Liechtenstein youth international footballers
Liechtenstein under-21 international footballers
Liechtenstein international footballers
Association football midfielders
FC Vaduz players
USV Eschen/Mauren players
Swiss Challenge League players
Swiss 1. Liga (football) players